Yann Schrub (born 20 March 1996) is a French middle- and long-distance runner. He won the bronze medal in the 10,000 metres at the 2022 European Athletics Championships.

Schrub is a two-time French national champion.

Achievements

International competitions

National titles
 French Athletics Championships
 10,000 metres: 2018
 French Indoor Athletics Championships
 3000 metres: 2017

References

External links

1996 births
Living people
French male long-distance runners
European Athletics Championships medalists